Karle IF is a Swedish football club located in Linköping.

Background
Karle IF currently plays in Division 4 Östergötland Västra which is the sixth tier of Swedish football. They play their home matches at the Karlbergsplan in Linköping.

Karle IF are affiliated to Östergötlands Fotbollförbund.

Season to season

In their most successful period Karle IF competed in the following divisions:

In recent seasons Karle IF have competed in the following divisions:

Footnotes

External links
 Karle IF – Official website
 Karle IF on Facebook

Sport in Östergötland County
Football clubs in Östergötland County
Association football clubs established in 1927
1927 establishments in Sweden